The 2010 Appalachian State Mountaineers football team represented Appalachian State University in the 2010 NCAA Division I FCS football season. The team was led by head coach Jerry Moore in his 22nd season and played their home games at Kidd Brewer Stadium. They were members of the Southern Conference.

Schedule

Game summaries

Chattanooga

Jacksonville

North Carolina Central

Samford

Elon

The Citadel

Western Carolina

Furman

Georgia Southern

Wofford

Florida

Western Illinois

Villanova

Rankings

References

Appalachian State
Appalachian State Mountaineers football seasons
Southern Conference football champion seasons
Appalachian State
Appalachian State Mountaineers football